The women's triple jump at the 2015 World Championships in Athletics was held at the Beijing National Stadium on 22 and 24 August.

The returning champion Caterine Ibargüen looked like the favorite, the most consistent jumper year round.  The world leader was the returning silver medalist Ekaterina Koneva and even her world leading jump lost the competition to a wind aided jump by Ibargüen.  The Olympic Champion Olga Rypakova had beaten Ibargüen both in the Olympics and at the 2011 World Championships, but not in the last three years.

Gabriela Petrova took the early lead with her first jump 14.52.  Former Ukrainian Hanna Knyazyeva-Minenko made a big improvement to her own National Record of her new country Israel with a 14.78.  Her lead lasted through two jumpers before Ibargüen took the lead with her second round 14.80.  That wasn't even her best jump of the day, but it was enough to beat any other athlete in the competition.  In the fourth round Ibargüen jumped 14.90 for the winner.  Rypakova moved into third position with a 14.59 in the fourth round.  Petrova answered with a 14.66 on her fifth attempt.  Rypakova came back on her final attempt, her 14.77 tickled Knyazyeva-Minenko's second place mark but was a cm short putting her in the bronze medal after Petrova was unable to answer a second time.  All of the first five performers had season bests.  Knyazyeva-Minenko's medal was the first World Championship medal for an Israeli woman.

Records
Prior to the competition, the records were as follows:

Qualification standards

Schedule

Results

Qualification
Qualification: 14.25 m (Q) or at least best 12 performers (q)

Final
The final was started at 19:30.

References

Triple jump
Triple jump at the World Athletics Championships
2015 in women's athletics